Riostegotherium was an extinct genus of armadillo from the Early to Late Eocene of South America. Fossils of the genus have been found in the Andesitas Huancache Formation of Argentina and in the Itaboraí Formation, Rio de Janeiro, Brazil.

Etymology 
The genus is named Riostegotherium after Rio, of Rio de Janeiro, in reference to the state where the specimens were found; stego (Latin), meaning "covering"; therium (a latinized Greek word), meaning "beast", a commonly-used suffix for mammalian genera.

Description 
It is known from fossil of armoured ossicles which are similar to the ossicles of the armour of modern armadillos that is obvious that in South American as far back as the late Paleocene armoured armadillos existed. Leg bones found in the area of probably came from Riostegotherium as well.

References

Bibliography

Further reading 
 World Encyclopedia of Dinosaurs & Prehistoric Creatures - Dougal Dixon

†Riostegotherium
Ypresian life
Lutetian life
Eocene mammals of South America
Itaboraian
Mustersan
Divisaderan
Paleogene Argentina
Fossils of Argentina
Paleogene Brazil
Fossils of Brazil
Fossil taxa described in 1998